Happy Valley is a shopping mall in the Zhujiang New Town  of the Tianhe District, Guangzhou, China.

Overview

The mall, completed in 2012, has  of floor space designed by Altoon-Partners and Benoy Ltd. The total floor area makes it the biggest shopping mall in Zhujiang New Town. The mall is managed by the Paragon Group (Guangzhou).

The mall is home to many multinational retailers such as Class Cavalli of Roberto Cavalli, Maxvalu Tokai, Uniqlo, Dirk Bikkembergs, NEW LOOK, H&M, MUJI, and is home to the Guangzhou flagship venue of China Film Cinema.

The English and Chinese names of the shopping mall are unrelated: the Chinese name is 太陽新天地購物中心 (“Sun Plaza Shopping Center”).

Location and accessibility

Happy Valley is located at 36 Ma Chang Road, Guangzhou. There are 1200 dedicated parking spaces and the location is well accessible through public transport by a bus stop in front of the mall and Guangzhou Metro Line 5, Guangzhou Metro at close by Tancun Station.

The Happy Valley Mall is within close walking distance to several luxurious residential properties such as The Canton Mansion, Guangzhou Yitong Mansion and Yu Feng Park Towers. The mall is also adjacent to premium office space including the China Unicom Square, the GRC Cooperative Union,  the Fuli Kexun Building, and is within a 10-minute drive from the Guangzhou International Finance Center.

The mall is in the proximity of Zhujiang Park, as well as Guangzhou Jockey Club and the “72 Golf” Golf Driving Range. Jinan University  (the first university in China to recruit foreign students and the university with the largest number of international students) is located across Huangpu Avenue.

The mall is also in the vicinity of a host of leading hotels and serviced apartments such as The Vanburgh Hotel, The Jockey Club Hotel, W Hotel, The Guangzhou Ritz-Carlton Hotel and Ascott IFC apartments of The Ascott Limited.

History

See also
TaiKoo Hui—another international shopping mall in Guangzhou's Tianhe District.

References

External links
 Website of the Happy Valley Mall
 Website of the Paragon Group (Guangzhou)

Shopping malls in Guangzhou
Shopping malls established in 2012
Tianhe District